Devprayag  (Deva prayāga) is a town and a nagar panchayat, near New Tehri city in Tehri Garhwal District in the state of Uttarakhand, India, and is the final one of the Panch Prayag (five confluences) of Alaknanda River where Alaknanda meets the Bhagirathi river and both rivers thereafter flow on as the Ganges river or Ganga.

Overview

Traditionally, it is considered to be the place where sage Dev Sharma led his ascetic life, giving birth to its present name, Devprayag. It is one of the five sacred confluences in the hills and is an important place of pilgrimage for devout Hindus.

"Devprayag" means "Godly Confluence" in Sanskrit. According to Hindu scriptures, Devprayag is the sacred place of merging of two visible heavenly rivers, Alakananda and Bhagirathi, to form the holy Ganga. 

On a terrace in the upper part of the village is the temple of Raghunathji, built of huge stones, pyramidal in form, and capped by a white cupola.

Geography
The Alaknanda rises at the confluence and feet of the Satopanth and Bhagirath Kharak glacier in Uttarakhand near the border with Tibet. The headwaters of the Bhagirathi are formed at Gaumukh, at the foot of the Gangotri glacier and Khatling glaciers in the Garhwal Himalaya. These two sacred rivers join to form the Ganges (Ganga) in Devprayag.

Devprayag is 70 km from Rishikesh. Devprayag has an average elevation of 830 metres (2,723 feet).

Demographics

 India census, Devprayag had a population of 2144. Males constitute 52% of the population and females 48%. Devprayag has an average literacy rate of 77%, higher than the national average of 74.5%; male literacy is 82% and, female literacy is 72%. In Devprayag, 13% of the population is under 6 years of age. The town is the seat of the pandas of the Badrinath Dham.

In popular culture

Devprayag has been featured prominently in the films Kisna: The Warrior Poet and Ponga Pandit.

How to reach

Air

Railway
The nearest railway stations is at Rishikesh. However, Rishikesh is a small railway station not connected by fast trains. Haridwar railway junction, 24 km farther from Rishikesh, has train connections to most of the major cities in India and is, therefore, the railhead for Devprayag.

Road
Devprayag lies on national highway NH58 that connects Delhi with Badrinath and Mana Pass in Uttarakhand near Indo-Tibet border. Therefore, all the buses and vehicles that carry pilgrims from New Delhi to Badrinath via Haridwar and Rishikesh in pilgrim season of summer months pass through Devprayag on the way to Joshimath and further north. Rishikesh is the major starting point for road journey to Devprayag and regular buses operate from Rishikesh bus station to Devprayag.

 Haridwar to Rishikesh 24 km
 Rishikesh to Devprayag 74 km 
 Devprayag to Srinagar 34 km
 Srinagar to Rudraprayag 33 km

Gallery

See also 
Rudraprayag
Ganges River (Also known as Ganga in India)

References

External links

 Regional Govt Official website
 Devprayag photo gallery
 Devprayag on wikimapia

Hindu pilgrimage sites in India
Cities and towns in Tehri Garhwal district